Wamuran is a rural town and locality in the Moreton Bay Region, Queensland, Australia.

Wamuran is known for its fresh strawberries and pineapples.

Geography

Wamuran is located west of the larger centre of Caboolture, and southeast of D'Aguilar.

In the north of Wamuran are several small sections of Beerburrum West State Forest.  Part of the south west boundary is marked by the Caboolture River.

History
The locality takes its name from its railway station, which was named in 1909 after local Aboriginal man, Menvil Wamuran (also known as Jacky Delaney).

Newlands Provisional School opened in 1915 and closed in 1927.

Wamuran Provisional School opened on 17 October 1921. It later became Wamuran State School, possibly in 1925 when it moved into a new school building which had formerly been the Twin View State School near Elimbah.

St Martin's Anglican Church was dedicated on 7 November 1871 by Coadjutor Bishop John Hudson. Its closure was approved in August 1992.

Wamuran Baptist Church opened in 1921. It was built on land described as a "magnificent site" donated by Mr H. Behrens.

The median age of the Wamuran population was 38 years, 1 year above the national median of 37.  81.1% of people living in Wamuran were born in Australia. The other top responses for country of birth were England 4.6%, New Zealand 2.5%, Korea, Republic of 1.2%, South Africa 0.9%, Germany 0.7%.  91.3% of people spoke only English at home; the next most common languages were 0.9% Italian, 0.7% German, 0.7% Vietnamese, 0.6% Korean, 0.4% Afrikaans.

Education 
Wamuran State School is a government primary (Prep-6) school for boys and girls at 1066-1086 D'Aguilar Highway. In 2017, the school had an enrolment of 300 students with 23 teachers (18 full-time equivalent) and 19 non-teaching staff (11 full-time equivalent).

There are no secondary schools in Wamuran. The nearest government secondary schools are Tullawong State High School and Caboolture State High School, both in neighbouring Caboolture to the east.

References

External links

 
 Town map of Wamuran, 1972

Suburbs of Moreton Bay Region
Localities in Queensland
Towns in Queensland